Street Fighter is a 1994 action film written and directed by Steven E. de Souza, based on the video game series of the same name produced by Capcom. Distributed by Universal Pictures in the United States and Columbia Pictures internationally, the film stars Jean-Claude Van Damme and Raul Julia (in his final film) along with supporting performances by Byron Mann, Damian Chapa, Kylie Minogue, Ming-Na Wen and Wes Studi. Loosely following the plot of Street Fighter II: The World Warrior, the film focuses on the efforts of Colonel Guile (Van Damme) to bring down General M. Bison (Juliá), the military dictator and drug kingpin of Shadaloo City who aspires to conquer the world with an army of genetic supersoldiers, while enlisting the aid of street fighters Ryu (Mann) and Ken (Chapa) to infiltrate Bison's empire and help destroy it from within.

It was not well-received by critics for its campy tone, unfaithfulness to the source material, and overblown effects. However, Raúl Juliá's performance as M. Bison was praised by critics and garnered him a posthumous nomination for Best Supporting Actor at the Saturn Awards. The film was Julia's final theatrical performance, as he died of stomach cancer two months before the film's release; the film is dedicated to his memory.

Plot
In the Southeast Asian nation of Shadaloo, civil war has erupted between the forces of drug lord-turned-General M. Bison and the Allied Nations led by Colonel William F. Guile. Bison has captured several A.N. relief workers, and via a live two-way radio broadcast, demands Guile secure a US$20 billion ransom in three days. Guile refuses and vows to track Bison down and place him on trial for his crimes, but his assistant, Lieutenant Cammy White, is only partially able to pinpoint Bison's location to the river-delta region outside the city. One hostage is Guile's friend Sergeant Carlos "Charlie" Blanka, who Bison orders taken to his lab for his captive doctor and scientist, Dhalsim, to turn into the first of his supersoldiers. Though Charlie is severely disfigured by the procedure, Dhalsim secretly alters his cerebral programming to maintain Charlie's humanity.

American con artists Ryu Hoshi and Ken Masters attempt to swindle arms dealer Viktor Sagat by providing him with fake weaponry. Sagat sees through the ruse and has Ryu fight his cage champion, Vega, but Guile bursts in and arrests all those present for violating a curfew. On the prison grounds, Guile witnesses Ryu and Ken fighting Sagat's men, and recruits them to help him find Bison in exchange for their freedom since Sagat is Bison's arms supplier. They are given a homing device and win Sagat's trust by staging a prison escape and faking Guile's death. However, news reporter Chun-Li Zang, whose father was killed by Bison, and her crew, former sumo wrestler Edmond Honda and boxer Balrog, who are out for revenge against Sagat for ruining their careers, stumble across the plan. Over Guile's objections, they attempt to assassinate the two warlords at a party. To maintain Bison's trust, Ryu and Ken stop the assassination and reveal the conspirators to Bison.

Returning to his base, Bison inducts Ryu and Ken into his organization and orders Honda and Balrog imprisoned and Chun-Li taken to his quarters. Ryu and Ken break Balrog and Honda out of confinement and rush to confront Bison, who is fighting Chun-Li, but Bison escapes and releases sleeping gas, sedating them all. Guile plans his assault on Bison's base. He is impeded by the Deputy Secretary of the A.N., who informs Guile that the decision has been made to pay Bison the ransom, but Guile and his loyal troops nevertheless proceed with the mission. At the base, Dhalsim is found out by a security guard; during the ensuing fight, Charlie is released, and he kills the guard to protect Dhalsim. Guile arrives and sneaks into the lab, where he encounters Charlie. Guile prepares to shoot Charlie to end his suffering, but Dhalsim stops him. Bison prepares to kill the hostages by unleashing Charlie on them, but Guile emerges and engages Bison's guards until the remaining A.N. forces arrive. After Bison makes it clear that he will not surrender peacefully, Guile orders his allies to rescue the hostages and engages Bison in a personal duel. As Guile and Bison fight, Ryu and Ken defeat Sagat and Vega. Bison's computer expert Dee Jay flees through a secret passage, joined by Sagat. Bison's bodyguard, Zangief, engages Honda in a fight until learning from Dee Jay that Bison was the true enemy of freedom and peace, and sides with Ryu and Ken to save the hostages.

Guile gains the upper hand against Bison and kicks him into a bank of hard drives, electrocuting him. A revival system restores Bison and he reveals that his suit includes advanced automatic first-aid mechanisms and electrical weaponry, including superconducting boots that enable him to fly. These gadgets allow Bison to gain the upper hand and beat Guile viciously. As he moves to deal the death blow, Guile counters by kicking Bison into his monitor wall which explodes, apparently killing him and overloading the base's superconducting energy storage system. The hostages are rescued, but Guile stays behind to convince Dhalsim and Charlie to return with him. They refuse, with Dhalsim wishing to atone for his responsibilities in mutating Charlie. Guile flees the exploding base and reunites with his comrades.

In a post-credits scene, Bison is restored once again when solar power reactivates the system of his base, and his fist emerges through the rubble.

Cast

Street Fighters

Production
Because Capcom was co-financier of the film, every aspect of the production required their approval. Among other points, they mandated a December 1994 release date, which required the cast and crew to maintain an aggressive filming schedule. DeSouza says he wrote the initial draft of the script overnight, being made aware that Capcom executives were in Los Angeles on short notice and because he himself was a fan of the game.

Capcom had long envisioned Jean-Claude Van Damme as Guile and asked him to be cast. Raúl Juliá said that he accepted the role of Bison because his children are huge fans of the video game series. After Van Damme and Juliá were cast as Guile and Bison, most of the casting budget had been spent. Van Damme's fee alone took nearly $8 million of the film's $35-million budget. This meant that the majority of other parts had to go to little-known or unknown actors, such as Byron Mann, Damian Chapa, Peter Navy Tuiasosopo and Grand L. Bush. Kylie Minogue was cast as Cammy as a result of the Australian Actors' Guild wanting Steven E. de Souza to hire an Australian actor. By the time he received the request the only part not cast was that of Cammy. De Souza first learned of Minogue from her cover photo on a "World's 30 Most Beautiful People" edition of Who magazine. Japanese actor Kenya Sawada appeared in the film as a part of a promotional contract with Capcom.

The cast's physical training was handled by Hollywood trainer and world karate champion Benny Urquidez, who also appears in the film as one of Sagat's henchmen. Charlie Picerni was hired as the stunt coordinator; he took the job with the condition that he would need ample time to train the cast. De Souza agreed; however plans were switched once it was learned that Raúl Juliá was suffering from cancer. Initially plans were to shoot Juliá's less intensive scenes first while the rest of the cast would train with Picerni, however upon seeing Juliá, de Souza realized that they could not show him in his current weakened state and was forced to switch the filming around. This led to an environment where the cast would be trained only right before their scenes—sometimes only hours ahead.

De Souza stated that he did not want to make a generic martial arts movie and described the film as a cross between Star Wars, James Bond and a war film. In addition, he indicated that he also did not want to shoehorn in elements from the games, citing the previous year's poorly received Super Mario Bros. film as an example. De Souza said that he avoided the supernatural elements and powers from the games but would hint at their use for a sequel.

Street Fighter was filmed mostly in Queensland, Australia along the famous Gold Coast during the second and third quarters of 1994 with most of the interiors and exteriors filmed on soundstages in Brisbane. Some exterior scenes were filmed in Bangkok, Thailand which were used as the backdrop for the fictitious Shadaloo City. The Bangkok scenes were filmed first, in the second quarter of 1994, with filming in Australia beginning after three weeks in Bangkok. DeSouza envisioned the attack on Bison's hide-out to include helicopters but was unable to do so due to the political instability in the neighbouring Myanmar, which is why the AN troops attack via boats instead. This was referenced in the film's final script.

The MPAA gave the first submitted cut of the film an R classification which was unacceptably high for Capcom, who had stated from the start that it should be a PG-13 film. After various cuts were made a G rating—according to de Souza—was given which was bumped up to PG-13 with the addition of an expletive in post production.

The post-credits scene where Bison is revived was omitted from the theatrical release "out of deference to Raul Julia" but was retained in home video and DVD releases.

Music

Soundtrack

A soundtrack was released on December 6, 1994 by Priority Records featuring mostly rap or hip hop, which predates the soundtrack of Street Fighter III: 3rd Strike. The soundtrack found mild success, peaking at #135 on the Billboard 200 and #34 on the Top R&B/Hip-Hop Albums. Upon its release on home video in the United Kingdom, the soundtrack was given away free with every purchase of the VHS tape at branches of Tesco for a limited period. Although this was the only way for anybody in the UK to purchase the CD, "Straight to My Feet" by Hammer was still released as a single, which charted #57 in the UK.

Score
Graeme Revell composed the film's score, an hour of which was released by Varèse Sarabande. Revell ignored previously existing music from the franchise. The music differs from Revell's more popular style, most notably with the absence of pervasive electronic elements and is entirely orchestral as the score is performed by the London Symphony Orchestra. The campy style of the film is reflected in the score's parody cues. The music during the scene where Ryu faces Vega in the cage fight quotes Georges Bizet's Habanera from the opera Carmen, and a theme heard throughout the score, particularly in the track "Colonel Guile Addresses the Troops", is reminiscent of Bruce Broughton's main theme for Tombstone.

Release
Street Fighter had opened in New York and Los Angeles on December 23, 1994.

Box office
The film earned $3,124,775 on its opening day. It grossed $9,508,030 on its opening weekend, ranking at #3 behind Dumb and Dumber and The Santa Clause at the box office. On its second weekend it grossed $7,178,360 and dropped down to #7. The film grossed $33,423,521 at the domestic box office and $66,000,000 at the international box office, making a total of $99,423,521 worldwide.

Home media
The film was released on the VHS format in 1995, initially for video rental stores. In the United States, the film sold more than 250,000 rental tapes in 1995. The film was also broadcast on cable television, and later released on DVD, Blu-ray, and digital streaming.

Reception

Critical response

Leonard Maltin gave the film his lowest rating, writing that "even Jean-Claude Van Damme fans couldn't rationalize this bomb." Richard Harrington of The Washington Post said the film was "notable only for being the last film made by Raúl Juliá, an actor far too skilled for the demands of the evil warlord, Gen. M. Bison, but far too professional to give anything less than his best." Critic Stephen Holden of The New York Times referred to the film as "a dreary, overstuffed hodgepodge of poorly edited martial arts sequences and often unintelligible dialogue." Writing for Variety, Emanuel Levy stated that the film "suffers from the same problems that impaired Super Mario Bros.: It's noisy, overblown and effects-laden and lacks sustained action or engaging characters." Levy commented on Julia, referring to it as "his weakest performances, accentuating each and every syllable as if he were reciting a Shakespearean role of grand emotional range. It's too bad, for this is the accomplished actor's last film, and it is dedicated to him."

Leslie Felperin of Sight & Sound described Kylie Minogue as Cammy "hilarious miscasting as a military wench with Heidi plaits. The merest glimpse of her holding a bazooka and looking mean is enough to induce giggles in the most dour of viewers." David Hunter of The Hollywood Reporter said the film is "is neither a satisfying martial arts exercise for star Jean-Claude Van Damme nor the irresistible mainstream diversion it strives for."

Audiences polled by CinemaScore gave the film an average grade of "B−" on an A+ to F scale. It holds  rating on Rotten Tomatoes, based on  critic reviews, with the consensus reading, "Though it offers mild entertainment through campy one-liners and the overacting of the late Raul Julia, Street Fighters nonstop action sequences are not enough to make up for a predictable, uneven storyline."

Awards 

In 2009, Time listed the film on their list of top ten worst video games movies. GameTrailers ranked the film as the eighth worst video game film of all time.
The film also received two nominations at the Saturn Awards: Best Science Fiction Film and Best Supporting Actor (a posthumous nomination for Raúl Juliá).

Other media

Merchandise
A one shot comic book adaptation of the film, titled Street Fighter: The Battle for Shadaloo, was published by DC Comics in 1995. The comic was drawn by Nick J. Napolitano and written by Mike McAvennie. A Japanese one-shot manga adaptation by Takayuki Sakai was also published in the June 1995 issue of CoroCoro Comics Special.

Two video games based on the film were produced. The first was a coin-operated arcade game titled Street Fighter: The Movie, produced by American developer Incredible Technologies and distributed by Capcom. The second was a home video game developed by Capcom also titled Street Fighter: The Movie, released for the PlayStation and Sega Saturn. Despite sharing the same title, neither game is a port of the other, although they both used the same digitized footage of the films cast posing as the characters in each game. Capcom also announced that an "enhanced port" was being created for the Sega 32X by their newly formed USA research and development department. This version was never released.

Animated television series
Many plot elements of the film, such as Blanka's identity and Dhalsim's role as a scientist, were reused in the American-produced 1995, titled Street Fighter animated series, a follow-up to this film which combined story aspects of the film with those in the games.

Cancelled sequel
By 2003, plans were being made for a sequel, Street Fighter II. Rumored cast members included Van Damme, Dolph Lundgren, and Holly Valance. The project never materialized.

See also
 List of films based on video games

Notes

References

External links

 
 
 
 
 

1994 films
1994 action comedy films
1990s English-language films
1990s martial arts comedy films
American action comedy films
American martial arts comedy films
American war comedy films
Columbia Pictures films
Films about terrorism in Asia
Films adapted into comics
Films directed by Steven E. de Souza
Films scored by Graeme Revell
Films set in Thailand
Films shot in Queensland
Films shot in Thailand
Films with screenplays by Steven E. de Souza
Live-action films based on video games
Street Fighter films
Underground fighting films
Universal Pictures films
1990s American films